The National Social Democratic Front, later named the Social Democratic Alliance, was a South Vietnamese political party which was effectively a federation of different groups, united by their anti-communist stance. Its chairman was Lt. Gen. Nguyễn Văn Thiệu, leader of South Vietnam in 1965–1975.

History

Democratic Progressive Party
The party was founded as the Democratic Progressive Party or symply Democratic Party by Nguyễn Văn Thiệu in 1967. It was not linked with its North Vietnam namesake, aligned with Viet Minh and Communists.
The Democratic Party, expressing farmers, workers and small traders, participated to presidential election of 1967, supporting President Nguyễn Văn Thiệu and his military rule. The party also adopted the flag of the National Revolutionary Movement and the Vanguard Youth, a youth organization that participated to August Revolution in 1945 against French colonial rule.

National Social Democratic Front
As the Vietnam War flared up, the Democratic Party tried to build a coalition with other anti-communist parties. In 1969, the Democrats finally dissolved themselves into a new subject, the National Social Democratic Front. The party became quickly a federation of several organizations and parties, such as: persecuted Roman Catholics who fled from North Vietnam; the Vietnam Republic Veterans Association, who sympathized with military rule; the Vietnamese Kuomintang, ideologically opposed to communists like its Chinese counterpart; the Democratic Socialist Party, who rejected communists' atheism for Buddhist socialism; the Nationalist Party of Greater Vietnam (along with its militant's branch, the National Radical Movement), that desired to reunify Vietnam but not under communists; the Personalist Revolutionary Party, the heir of Can Lao Party and the Peasants' and Workers' Party, supporting rural interests and opposite to Viet Cong's guerrilla.

Social Democratic Alliance
The parties' federation was functional during Nguyễn Văn Thiệu's tenure as president and changed its name to Social Democratic Alliance in 1973. However, with the Vietnamization policy adopted by U.S. President Richard Nixon, South Vietnam inexorably started its collapse. The Paris Peace Accords of 1973 was a turning point in the war, causing the end of American intervention in Vietnam. Despite the peace agreement between communist North Vietnam and capitalist South Vietnam, in 1975 North Vietnam broke the peace and started the takeover of South Vietnam. Since the United States refused another intervention, South Vietnam collapsed after the Fall of Saigon, causing the reunification of Vietnam under communist rule.

Democratic Alliance for Vietnam

Many members of the Front and South Vietnamese government were executed by the new administration, but others fled from Vietnam. In 1981, many former members of the Front created the Democratic Alliance for Vietnam, a pluralist extra-parliamentary opposition group based in California who want restore freedom and democracy in Vietnam.

Prominent members

Nguyễn Văn Thiệu
Nguyễn Văn Hiếu
Nguyễn Văn Kiểu
Trần Văn Hương
Dương Văn Minh
Vũ Văn Mẫu
Nguyễn Cao Kỳ
Nguyễn Tôn Hoàn
Tôn Thất Đính
Trần Thiện Khiêm
Hoàng Đức Nhã
Trần Văn Lắm
Nguyễn Ngọc Huy
Bùi Diễm
Trương Đình Dzu
Hồ Ngọc Nhuận
Đỗ Mậu
Nguyễn Hữu Có
Nguyễn Văn Hảo
Nguyễn Xuân Oánh
Trần Văn Đỗ
Trần Văn Đôn
Trần Văn Tuyên
Trần Văn Chiêu
Lê Minh Trí
Trần Trung Dung
Vương Văn Bắc
Phan Quang Đán
Võ Long Triều
[...]

Electoral history

Presidential elections

See also

National Revolutionary Movement
Vietnamese National Alliance
Rally for Democracy and Pluralism

Notes and references

Notes

References

Further reading

Documents
Bùi Diễm & David Chanoff, In the Jaws of History, Indiana University Press ; Illustrated edition, April 1, 1999
Phạm Công Luận, Hồi ức, sưu khảo, ghi chép về văn hóa Sài Gòn, Phuongnam Books & Thegioi Publishing House, Saigon, 2016–2022
Kiều Chinh, Nghệ sĩ lưu vong : Hồi ký, Văn Học Press, Irvine, California, United States, 2021
 David Chanoff and Doan Van Toai (1986) Vietnam: A Portrait of Its People at War, I.B. Tauris Publishers
 Sharon, Ariel and David Chanoff (1989) Warrior : the autobiography of Ariel Sharon; New York : Simon and Schuster
 Good, Kenneth and David Chanoff (1992) Into the heart : one man's pursuit of love and knowledge among the Yanomami, Ulverscroft
 Crowe, William J and David Chanoff (1993) The line of fire : from Washington to the Gulf, the politics and battles of the new military, Simon & Schuster
 Elders, M Joycelyn and David Chanoff (1996) Joycelyn Elders, M.D. : from sharecropper's daughter to surgeon general of the United States of America, Morrow
 White, Augustus A. and David Chanoff (2011) Seeing Patients: Unconscious Bias in Health Care, Harvard University Press
Zadman, Felix and David Chanoff (1995) Never the last journey: a Fortune 500 founder's life story from Holocaust survivor to victor on Wall Street, Shocken

External links
 The Constitution of the Republic of Vietnam 1956 (archived from the original on 2009-03-25)
The Constitution of the Republic of Vietnam 1967
 HIẾN PHÁP VIỆT NAM CỘNG HOÀ 1967
Timeline of NVA invasion of South Vietnam
Ông Hoàng Đức Nhã : 45 năm nhìn lại biến cố 30/4 (VOA)
KIM NHUNG SHOW | SBTN | Cựu Tổng trưởng Hoàng Đức Nhã 1 2 3
Chương trình Lịch Sử VNCH qua phỏng vấn đặc biệt Cựu Tổng Trưởng Hoàng Đức Nhã
Nguyên Tổng trưởng Hoàng Đức Nhã và các tổng trưởng VNCH viếng Việt Museum

1967 establishments in South Vietnam
1970s disestablishments in South Vietnam
1975 disestablishments in Vietnam
Anti-communism in Vietnam
Anti-communist parties
Banned political parties in Vietnam
Defunct political parties in Vietnam
History of South Vietnam
Nationalist parties in Vietnam
Political parties disestablished in 1975
Political parties established in 1967
Political party alliances in Vietnam